Straight-acting is a term for a same gender-attracted person who does not exhibit the appearance or mannerisms of what is seen as stereotypical for gay people. Although the label is used by and reserved almost exclusively for gay and bisexual men, it may also be used to describe a lesbian or bisexual woman exhibiting a feminine appearance and mannerisms. Because the term invokes negative stereotypes of gay people, its application is often controversial and may cause offense.

Proposed explanations and criticisms
Communication Scholar, Shinsuke Eguchi (2009)  proposes to explain the emergence of the straight acting phenomenon "because some gay men want to achieve hegemonic masculinity to overcome gay effeminate images". Both Eguchi  and Tim Berling relate it to the general context of sissyphobia—the dominant cultural norm that disparages effeminate men, which is not restricted to the gay culture. In "Negotiating Sisyphobia: A critical/ interpretive analysis of one ‘femme’ gay Asian body in the heteronormative world," Shinsuke Eguchi (2011) writes, "I began to see that the discursive manifestation of sissyphobia is not that feminine gay men are unattractive and undesirable. Rather, these straight-acting gay men would like to present their “heteronormative” masculine faces in their social interactions with others" (p. 50).

Sex advice columnist Dan Savage commented on the popularity of the term "straight-acting" in gay personal ads, criticizing both the practice and the idea that a man seeking a gay relationship through a gay personal ad is acting straight. Defenders of the term maintain it refers merely to one's mannerisms and that critics' isolation of the word "acting" in the phrase distorts the intended meaning of the phrase. Use of the term itself has been labeled as damaging to the LGBT community, as it associates certain attributes with homosexuality.

Men who use the expression "straight-acting" may express resentment that critics claim the term implies they are acting and not being their true selves.

QUASH
Queers United Against Straight Acting Homosexuals (QUASH) was the organization in Chicago that published an often cited article in their newsletter in 1993. Titled; "Assimilation is Killing Us Fight For a Queer United Front." The article calls for a new order in our gendered social systems to be inclusive and not exclude anyone from liberation, challenging the power and privilege of the dominant members of society. An article similar to "Assimilation is Killing Us", published a year later, entitled, QUASH, still standing for Queers United Against Straight-Acting Homosexuals, used the same concept of rejection of the established gendered protocols, specifically, that there can be varied and better institutions than couple hood and marriage.

See also

 Acting white
 Down-low
 Gaydar
 Gender role (in non-heterosexuals)
 Internalized homophobia
 Liberal homophobia
 Masculinity
 Men who have sex with men
 Metrosexual
 Queer erasure
 Same-sex attraction
 Straightwashing

References

Cultural assimilation
Gay masculinity
LGBT terminology
Stereotypes
LGBT erasure